Marvin Watson Jr. (born March 19, 1976), better known by his stage name Messy Marv, is an American rapper who began his career in the Fillmore District of San Francisco, California.<ref>{{cite web|url=https://www.siccness.net/wp/cash-lord-mess-california-live-presents-the-second-round-on-me-cash-lords-tour|title=Cash Lord Mess 'The Second Round On Me Cash Lords Tour|website=Siccness.net|language=en-US|access-date=2018-09-26}}</ref> Messy was also known as a collaborator in the rap group Kaalman's Krew.

Recent career
On November 2, 2007, Messy Marv was released from jail after serving twelve months on weapons charges. Before, during and following his jail sentence, he had several previous albums charting, including Cake & Ice Cream 2, released in 2009 and peaked on the R&B/Hip-Hop Albums chart at #39 and on the Rap Albums chart at #12, and Blow: Blocks and Boat Docks, a collaboration album with Berner released in 2010 which peaked at #48 on the R&B/Hip-Hop Albums chart. In the spring of 2012, Messy Marv released the hit mixtape, Da Frank Lucas Dat Neva Wore Da Mink Coat and released the hit single, "You Gotta Pay Me". In 2013, he announced the release of his newest LP "Playboy Gangsta" under his new moniker LilPaperdupMess, and released 3 singles as promotionals for the album: "We Killas", "Beautiful Kalifornia", & "A Girlfriend Ain't What I Need". Marv confirmed via Twitter a release date of July 23, 2013 for the LP.  Early in 2014  with a  guest feature on single "World Wide Mob" alongside  Montana Montana Montana, Joe Blow, Ap.9, and Fed X

On July 3, 2018, Messy Marv and San Quinn released a 12 song compilation titled Joc Nation (Well Connected).

On December 3, 2018, Messy Marv aka Cashlord Mess signed to Mozzy Records.

Controversy
Obie Trice
In 2005, he was in a feud with G-Unit, which escalated when Obie Trice, a member of Shady Records, went to the radio station KMEL and said, "in San Francisco I have to cover my ass." A diss track was released by Guce and Messy Marv, "50 Explanations", on the album Pill Music: The Rico Act, Vol. 1. 
50 Cent and Sha Money XL then exchanged words over the phone with Guce's camp. 
He afterwards said, "it's over with, and it never kicked off".

San Quinn
Messy Marv started a feud with his cousin San Quinn on September 22, 2008, by calling the latter a "snitch". On December 11, Quinn told HipHopDX that he "loves" Messy Marv despite the diss tracks that they have both sent to each other. In a 2010 interview with WordofSouth, he stated the reason for the beef was because he was "talking too much", but that they are attempting to squash the feud.

Spider Loc
On April 19, 2007, rapper Spider Loc released a diss track at Marv, and Game called "Ova Killa" featuring Papa Smurf.

Mistah F.A.B.
In 2009, Messy Marv mocked rapper Mistah F.A.B.'s chain getting stolen repeatedly. This led to diss tracks being sent between the rappers, including F.A.B. sending one entitled "Okay" where he impersonates Watson Jr.

Philthy Rich
On September 25, 2013, Philthy Rich released a track entitled "Swear to God" featuring Kurt Diggler. It dissed Marv and Bay Area rappers Kafani & DB Tha General. The track is to appear on his upcoming album N.E.R.N.L. 3. In response, Marv plans on releasing a diss record entitled Philthy Rich Is a Bitch on October 22 under his alias LilPaperdupMess. On October 15, Philthy Rich released a diss track at Marv in his freestyle to Drake's "Pound Cake / Paris Morton Music 2". The next day, Marv released a diss track at Philthy entitled "I'm Right Here". The same day, October 16, Philthy released a diss record entitled Messy Marv aka the Girl Girl Is a Fake Blood''.

Discography

References

External links
Messy Marv at MySpace
Scalen LLC

Living people
Rappers from the San Francisco Bay Area
Hip hop musicians from San Francisco
1976 births
MNRK Music Group artists
West Coast hip hop musicians
Gangsta rappers
21st-century American rappers
21st-century American male musicians